Bemerton Rectory is a Grade II* listed rectory in Lower Road in the Bemerton suburb of Salisbury, Wiltshire, England. It dates from 1470. It was the home of George Herbert, who died there in 1633. Indian novelist and poet Vikram Seth currently resides in the house, having bought and renovated it in 1996.

References

External links

Grade II* listed buildings in Wiltshire
Grade II* listed houses
Buildings and structures in Salisbury